The 323d Strategic Reconnaissance Squadron is an inactive United States Air Force unit.  Its last was assigned to the 91st Strategic Reconnaissance Wing, stationed at Lockbourne Air Force Base, Ohio.  It was inactivated on 8 November 1957.

The squadron was first activated in 1942 as the 323d Bombardment Squadron.  After training in the United States, it moved to the European Theater of Operations, where it participated in the strategic bombing campaign against Germany.  It was awarded two Distinguished Unit Citations for combat in Germany.  Following V-E Day, the squadron returned to the United States and was inactivated in late 1945.

The squadron was redesignated the 323d Strategic Reconnaissance Squadron and activated at McGuire Air Force Base, New Jersey in 1947.  Squadron elements deployed and again saw combat during the Korean War.  It was inactivated at Lockbourne Air Force Base, Ohio in November 1957.

History

World War II

Organization and training in the United States
The squadron was first activated on 15 April 1942 at Harding Field as the 323rd Bombardment Squadron, one of the three original bombardment squadrons of the 91st Bombardment Group. It was equipped with the Boeing B-17 Flying Fortress. It completed First Phase training at MacDill Field under Third Air Force, with Second and Third Phase training at Walla Walla Army Air Field under Second Air Force in Washington. The air echelon moved to Gowen Field, Idaho on 24 August 1942, and began receiving new B-17s there. It becan flying them from Dow Field, Maine in September, although it was not fully equipped with new aircraft until October.

Combat in Europe

The ground echelon was established temporarily at RAF Kimbolton by 13 September 1942.  However, the runways at Kimbolton were not up to handling heavy bombers, and the unit moved to what would be its permanent station in the European Theater of Operations, RAF Bassingbourn, on 14 October 1942.  Bassingbourn had been a prewar Royal Air Force station, so the squadron found itself in more comfortable quarters than most of its contemporaries.  The squadron primarily engaged in the strategic bombing campaign against Germany, and flew its first mission on 7 November, an attack against submarine pens at Brest, France.

Until the middle of 1943, The squadron concentrated its attacks on naval targets, including submarine pens, dockyards, ship construction facilities and harbors, although it also struck airfields, factories, and communications facilities.  On 27 January 1943, the unit attacked the Kriegsmarine yard at Wilhelmshaven as part of the first penetration by bombers of VIII Bomber Command to a target in Germany.  On 4 March 1943, it attacked marshalling yards at Hamm, Germany despite adverse weather and heavy enemy opposition.  For this action, it was awarded its first Distinguished Unit Citation (DUC).  

From the middle of 1943 to the end of the war, the squadron concentrated on attacks on German aviation, including attacks on aircraft factories, including ones at Oranienburg and Brussels; airfields at Oldenburg and Villacoublay; the ball bearing plants at Schweinfurt; chemical plants at Leverkusen and Peenemunde; and industrial facilities in Ludwigshafen, Frankfurt am Main and Wilhemshaven.  As part of this attack on the German aircraft industry, on 11 January, the squadron penetrated into central Germany, despite bad weather, poor fighter cover, and strong attacks by enemy interceptor aircraft, the unit succeeded in bombing its target, earning a second DUC.

The squadron also performed interdiction and air support missions.  It helped prepare for Operation Overlord, the invasion of Normandy, by bombing gun emplacements and troop concentrations near the beachhead area.  It aided Operation Cobra, the breakout at Saint Lo, in July 1944 by attacking enemy troop positions.  It supported troops on the front lines near Caen in August 1944 and attacked lines of communications near the battlefield during the Battle of the Bulge in December 1944 and January 1945.  It attacked airfields, bridges, and railroads to support Operation Lumberjack, the push across the Rhine in Germany, in 1945.

Following V-E Day, the squadron evacuated prisoners of war from German camps. The first B-17 left Bassingbourn for the United States on 27 May 1945. The squadron was reestablished at Drew Field, Florida in early July, with the intention of deploying it to the Pacific, but it was not fully manned or equipped, and inactivated on 7 November 1945.

Cold War

Reactivated in 1947 as a Strategic Air Command long-range strategic reconnaissance squadron; not manned or equipped until July 1948.  Used B-17 and B-29 bombers refitted for reconnaissance missions.   Deployed to Japan in 1950, and performed strategic reconnaissance missions over Korea, and the Northern Pacific coast of Communist China and the Soviet Union.   Re-equipped with North American RB-45C Tornado jet reconnaissance aircraft, flying reconnaissance and mapping combat missions over Korea until being assigned to the United States in mid 1952.    Re-equipped with Boeing RB-47E Stratojets, performed various reconnaissance missions on a worldwide scale until inactivation in 1957.

Lineage
 Constituted as the 323d Bombardment Squadron (Heavy) on 28 January 1942
 Activated on 15 April 1942
 Redesignated 323d Bombardment Squadron, Heavy on 20 August 1943
 Inactivated on 7 November 1945
 Redesignated 323d Reconnaissance Squadron on 11 June 1947
 Activated on 1 July 1947
 Inactivated on 10 November 1948
 Activated on 1 June 1949
 Redesignated: 323d Strategic Reconnaissance Squadron, Medium on 6 July 1950
 Inactivated on 8 November 1957

Assignments
 91st Bombardment Group, 15 April 1942 – 7 November 1945
 91st Reconnaissance Group (later 91st Strategic Reconnaissance) Group, 1 July 1947 (attached to 55th Strategic Reconnaissance Wing 19 September – 10 October 1949, 91st Strategic Reconnaissance Wing after 10 February 1951)
 91st Strategic Reconnaissance Wing, 28 May 1952 – 8 November 1957

Stations
 Harding Field, Louisiana, 15 April 1942
 MacDill Field, Florida, 13 May 1942
 Walla Walla Army Air Base, Washington, 22 June-24 August 1942
 RAF Kimbolton (AAF-117), England, 13 September 1942
 RAF Bassingbourn (AAF-121), England, 14 October 1942 – 22 June 1945
 Drew Field, Florida, 3 July-7 November 1945
 Andrews Field (later Andrews Air Force Base), Maryland, 1 July 1947
 McGuire Air Force Base, New Jersey, 19 July – 10 November 1948
 McGuire Air Force Base, New Jersey, 1 June 1949
 Forbes Air Force Base, Kansas, 19 September 1949
 Barksdale Air Force Base, Louisiana, 10 October 1949 
 Lockbourne Air Force Base, Ohio, 11 September 1951 – 8 November 1957

Aircraft
 Boeing B-17 Flying Fortress, 1942–1945, 1949
 Boeing RB-17 Flying Fortress, 1948–1949
 Boeing B-29 Superfortress, 1949–1950
 Boeing RB-29 Superfortress, 1949–1950
 North American B-45 Tornado, 1950–1953
 North American RB-45C Tornado, 1950–1953
 Boeing RB-47E Stratojet, 1953–1957

Awards and campaigns

References

Notes
 Explanatory notes

 Citations

Bibliography

 
 
 
 
 
 

Units and formations of Strategic Air Command
Reconnaissance squadrons of the United States Air Force